Crooked Creek is a  long 3rd order tributary to the Rocky River in Union County, North Carolina.

Course
Crooked Creek is formed at the confluence of North and South Forks of Crooked Creek about 0.5 miles northwest of Bentons Crossroads, North Carolina.  Crooked Creek then flows northeast to join the Rocky River about 7 miles northwest of New Salem.

Watershed
Crooked Creek drains  of area, receives about 47.9 in/year of precipitation, has a wetness index of 470.54, and is about 29% forested.

References

Rivers of North Carolina
Rivers of Union County, North Carolina